Benjamin Hayes served as a member of the California State Assembly, representing California's 1st State Assembly district, from 1867–1868.

References

Members of the California State Assembly
Year of birth missing
Year of death missing